Ian Hastie is an association football player who represented New Zealand at international level.

Hastie scored his only international goal on his full All Whites debut in a 2–4 loss to New Caledonia on 17 July 1971 and ended his international playing career with six A-international caps to his credit, his final cap an appearance in a 1–1 draw with Indonesia on 11 October 1972.

References 

Year of birth missing (living people)
Living people
New Zealand association footballers
New Zealand international footballers
Association footballers not categorized by position